Yamila Díaz-Rahi (born March 9, 1976), also Yamila Diaz, is an Argentine model. She has appeared in the Sports Illustrated Swimsuit Issue a total of 11 times, and made the cover of the magazine first in 2002 and again in 2006. She also featured in the 50th anniversary SI edition in 2014 titled "The Legends".

Background
Díaz was born in Buenos Aires, Argentina. Her father is of Spanish and Lebanese descent and her mother, Spanish. Her father was a doctor and her mother was a health care manager.  While studying Economics in Buenos Aires in 1996, she took a holiday in Uruguay where she was discovered by a scout from a Milan modeling agency.

Modeling career 

After working in Milan for a few years, she was featured in 1999 in the Sports Illustrated Swimsuit Issue, and made the cover of the magazine first in 2002 and again in 2006. On the 2006 cover, she appears with several other models for an "All-Stars" special.

Diaz-Rahi has also appeared on the cover of numerous magazines such as GQ, Glamour, Maxim, Elle, Marie Claire, Harper's Bazaar, Shape. She has appeared in the Victoria's Secret catalog, and in advertisements for Bebe, Emanuel Ungaro's Fleur de Diva perfume, Replay Jeans, the Cool Water perfume by Davidoff and other products.

She was the first Latin spokesmodel in CoverGirl history. Diaz-Rahi also starred in the 1999 Italian film The Fish in Love.

After modeling 
Diaz-Rahi is now a pottery artist in New York City.

References

External links 
 
 

1976 births
Living people
Argentine female models
Argentine people of Lebanese descent
Argentine people of Spanish descent
People from Buenos Aires
21st-century Argentine women